D'AR Wanderers Football Club
is a professional football club based in Temerloh, Pahang. The club currently competes in the Malaysia FAM League, the third tier of the Malaysian football league.

Club officials

Executive committee

Players

Current squad
As of 24 March 2018.

Coaching and technical staff

References

External links
 Official Website

Malaysia FAM League clubs
Football clubs in Malaysia
2017 establishments in Malaysia
Sport in Pahang